Valentin Rabouille (born 15 April 2000) is a French professional footballer who plays as a goalkeeper for Championnat National club Cholet.

Career
Rabouille made his professional debut with Nîmes in a 3–0 Coupe de la Ligue win over Lens on 29 October 2019. However, his senior debut had come almost two years prior, as he played in a 3–1 Coupe de France win over SC Anduzien on 3 December 2017.

On 23 September 2020, Rabouille signed for Championnat National 2 club Hyères. On 27 January 2022, he signed for Championnat National club Cholet.

References

External links
 
 

2000 births
Living people
Association football goalkeepers
French footballers
Nîmes Olympique players
Hyères FC players
AS Muret players
SO Cholet players
Championnat National 2 players
Championnat National 3 players
Sportspeople from Belfort
Footballers from Bourgogne-Franche-Comté